Joseph "Dutch" Bowers (December 13, 1896 – April 27, 1936) was the first man to attempt an escape from Alcatraz prison. He was born in Rohrbach, Austria. Bowers was arrested for robbery of mail with a firearm.

Alcatraz
Bowers arrived at Alcatraz on 4 September 1934.

On 27 April 1936, convict Henry Larry claims to have watched Bowers, who was feeding seagulls, stack some empty barrels and climb up next to the fence so he could retrieve a bit of food which had fallen on the barbed wire. He stood there feeding the birds for several minutes until a tower guard turned, saw him atop the fence, and fired on the convict. Bowers fell sixty feet to his death on the rocks below.

As documented in "The Desperate Escape of Joseph Bowers" at AlcatrazHistory.com:

Joseph Bowers was by all accounts a desperado and loner, unable to come to terms with the conditions of Alcatraz. Imprisoned during the toughest and most strict era on Alcatraz, Bowers, serving a 25-year sentence for Postal Mail Robbery that netted a mere sixteen dollars and thirty eight cents. He held an expansive criminal record and as one report highlighted: 'If at large, he probably would engage again in criminal activities and constitute a serious menace to the public safety and society.' He had claimed, and it was also supported in belief by fellow inmates that his crimes had resulted from a lacking ability to support himself. He claimed that he was completely desperate and out of funds, hungry and mostly unable to afford food or proper lodging.

The incident termed Bowers' "Desperate Escape" was variously deemed by inmates to have been an actual escape attempt, a deliberate suicide (Bowers had made multiple suicide attempts, and was deemed by some prisoners to be criminally insane), an attempt to climb up to grab garbage wedged in the chain link fence (Bowers was assigned to the garbage incinerator detail), or an attempt to climb the fence to feed a seagull. However, regardless of Bowers' initial motive, it is indisputable that Bowers ignored the guards' forceful signals to halt and he kept climbing even after the guards began firing, such that he fell on the outside of the fence.

References

Austrian prisoners and detainees
1896 births
1936 deaths
Inmates of Alcatraz Federal Penitentiary
Deaths by firearm in California
People convicted of robbery
Austrian people who died in prison custody